In mathematics, in triangle geometry, McCay cubic (also called M'Cay cubic or Griffiths cubic) is a cubic plane curve in the plane of the reference triangle and associated with it, and having several remarkable properties. It is the third cubic curve in Bernard Gilbert's Catalogue of Triangle Cubics and it is assigned the identification number K003.

Definition

The McCay cubic can be defined by locus properties in several ways. For example, the McCay cubic is the locus of a point P such that the pedal circle of P is tangent to the nine-point circle of the reference triangle ABC. The McCay cubic can also be defined as the locus of point P such that the circumcevian triangle of P and ABC are orthologic.

Equation of the McCay cubic
The equation of the McCay cubic in barycentric coordinates  is

The equation in trilinear coordinates  is

McCay cubic as a stelloid

A stelloid is a cubic that has three real concurring asymptotes making 60° angles with one another. McCay cubic is a stelloid in which the three asymptotes concur at the centroid of triangle ABC. A circum-stelloid having the same asymptotic directions as those of McCay cubic and concurring at a certain (finite) is called McCay stelloid. The point where the asymptoptes concur is called the "radial center" of the stelloid. Given a finite point X there is one and only one McCay stelloid with X as the radial center.

References

Triangle geometry